Aotearoa People's Network Kaharoa provides free internet access to New Zealand public libraries. Funding is provided by the New Zealand government by way of Community Partnership Fund and the National Library of New Zealand. The service was established in 2007, and is based in the Christchurch office of the National Library. It is governed by a Governance Group which has included people such as Paul Reynolds.

The network provides and maintains desktop computers and WiFi equipment at around 120 partner libraries, and provides them filtered internet access in conjunction with internet service provider Snap. , all partner libraries receive the equipment and access at no cost, although the funding is periodically reviewed.

In October 2009, Aotearoa People’s Network Kaharoa won the 3M Award for Innovation in Libraries.

In October 2010, Aotearoa People’s Network Kaharoa won Best Access Initiative 2010 from the Australia and New Zealand Internet Best Practise Awards.

References

External links
 Aotearoa People’s Network Kaharoa
 Aotearoa People’s Network Kaharoa at the National Library of New Zealand

Internet in New Zealand
Libraries in New Zealand
2007 establishments in New Zealand